The MBC Drama Awards is an awards ceremony presented by Munhwa Broadcasting Corporation (MBC) for outstanding achievements in Korean dramas aired on its network. It is held annually in December.

Unlike its counterparts in KBS and SBS, MBC's highest honor of the ceremony, the "Grand Prize", has been determined through viewer's votes in 2014, 2015 and 2016, not by professional judges. The process has been widely criticized.

Categories
Grand Prize (대상) is given to the best actor/actress of the year.
Drama of the Year (올해의 드라마)
Top Excellence in Acting Award (최우수상) 
Excellence in Acting Award (우수상) 
Golden Acting Award (황금 연기상)
Top 10 MBC Drama Stars is awarded to actors who have shown talent, hard work, and star power during the year.
Best Supporting Actor is given to the actor that showed the most talent and presence in a supporting role.
Best New Actor/Actress (신인상) 
Best Young Actor/Actress (아역 연기상)
Writer of the Year (올해의 작가상)
Producer's Award (프로듀서상) or PD Award (방송 3사 드라마 PD가 뽑은 올해의 연기자상) is given to the best actor/actress, as determined by PDs from all three broadcasters.
Popularity Award (인기상) or Netizen Popularity Award (네티즌 인기상)
Best Couple Award (베스트 커플상) is given to the best drama couple/s as voted by the netizens.
Viewer's Favorite Drama of the Year (시청자가 뽑은 올해의 드라마)
Family Award (가족상)
Special Award (특별상)
Achievement Award (공로상)
Best Character Award (최고의 캐릭터상)
Best Villain Award (최고의 악역상)
Fighting Spirit Acting Award (투혼 연기상)
Comic Character Award (코믹 캐릭터상)

Grand Prize (Daesang)
Note: 2014~2016, the Daesang has been determined through viewer's votes.

Drama of the Year

Top Excellence in Acting Awards

Best Actor

Best Actress

Best Actor in a Miniseries

Best Actress in a Miniseries

Best Actor in a Special Project Drama

Best Actress in a Special Project Drama

Best Actor in a Serial Drama

Best Actress in a Serial Drama

Best Actor in a Weekend Drama

Best Actress in a Weekend Drama

Best Actor in a Soap Opera

Best Actress in a Soap Opera

Best Actor in a Monday-Tuesday Drama

Best Actress in a Monday-Tuesday Drama

Best Actor in a Wednesday-Thursday Drama

Best Actress in a Wednesday-Thursday Drama

Best Actor  in a Daily Drama

Best Actress in a Daily Drama

Best Actor in a  Daily/One-Act Drama

Best Actress in a  Daily/One-Act Drama

Excellence in Acting Awards

Best Actor

Best Actress

Best Actor in a Miniseries

Best Actress in a Miniseries

Best Actor in a Special Project Drama

Best Actress in a Special Project Drama

Best Actor in a Serial Drama

Best Actress in a Serial Drama

Best Actor in a Weekend Drama

Best Actress in a Weekend Drama

Best Actor in a Soap Opera

Best Actress in a Soap Opera

Best Actor in a Monday-Tuesday Drama

Best Actress in a Monday-Tuesday Drama

Best Actor in a Wednesday-Thursday Drama

Best Actress in a Wednesday-Thursday Drama

Best Actor in a Short Drama

Best Actress in a Short Drama

Best Actor in a Daily/One Act Drama

Best Actress in a Daily/One Act Drama

Best Supporting Awards

Best Supporting Actor/Actress in a Monday-Tuesday Drama

Best Supporting Actor/Actress in a Wednesday-Thursday Drama

Best Supporting Actor/Actress in a Weekend Drama

Best Supporting Actor/Actress in a Serial Drama

Best Supporting Actor/Actress

Golden Acting Awards

Golden Acting Award, Actor

Golden Acting Award, Actress

Special Acting Awards

Newcomer Awards

Best New Actor

Best New Actress

Youth Awards

Best Young Actor

Best Young Actress

Best Character Award

Best Villain Award

Fighting Spirit Acting Award

Comic Character Award

PD Award

Writer of the Year

Actor of the Year

Popularity Awards

Popularity Award, Actor

Popularity Award, Actress

Best Couple Award

Viewer's Favorite Drama of the Year

Favorite Actor/Actress of the Year

Hallyu Star Award

Best TV Host / Special Award for TV MC

Best TV Voice Actor/Actress

Special Award in TV

Family Award

Radio

Top Excellence Award in Radio

Excellence Award in Radio

Best Newcomer in Radio

Best Writer in Radio

Best Voice Actor/Actress in Radio

Special Award in Radio

Achievement Award

See also

 List of Asian television awards
 KBS Drama Awards
 SBS Drama Awards

References

 
MBC TV original programming
South Korean television awards
Awards established in 1982
Annual events in South Korea
South Korea annual television specials
1982 establishments in South Korea